Lera Millard Thomas (August 3, 1900 – July 23, 1993) was an American politician who served as U.S. Representative in Congress representing the Eighth District of Texas from 1966 to 1967, after the death of her husband, Congressman Albert Thomas. She was the first woman to represent Texas in the U.S. House of Representatives. She also founded Millard's Crossing Historic Village.

Early life
Thomas was born Lera Millard on August 3, 1900, in Nacogdoches, Texas, the daughter of Jesse Waldington and Annie Donnell (née Watkins) Millard. She attended Brenau College in Gainesville, Georgia, and the University of Alabama. She married Albert Thomas in 1922, and they had three children: James Nelson, Anne, and Lera. Albert was elected to Congress in 1936, and they lived in Washington, D.C., after that. Lera was a member of the Houston League of Women Voters.

Elected to Congress
On February 15, 1966, her husband died and a special election was called for March 26, 1966 to elect another Representative. Lera Thomas was the first woman elected to Congress from the State of Texas, when she was elected as a Democrat in the special election to succeed her deceased husband. She received over 74% of the vote against Republican Louis Leman, who urged voters to vote for the Widow Thomas. She served on the Merchant Marine and Fisheries Committee where she supported funds to expand the Houston Ship Channel. Thomas did not stop with the Houston Ship Channel, continuing her husband's work she became vital in the creation of a NASA branch within her district, adjacent to other exiting laboratories. Because he died after filing for office in 1966, Albert Thomas's name remained on the Democratic Primary ballot for the 8th District and his widow determined that she would not seek a full term for 1967. State Representative Bob Eckhardt won the primary for a full term. After serving the remainder of her husband's term, Thomas left Congress on January 3, 1967. After her term in Congress, Mrs. Thomas served as special liaison for the Houston Chronicle to members of the armed services in Vietnam.

Later years
When she returned from Vietnam, Thomas founded Millard's Crossing Historic Village in Nacogdoches. After returning Thomas served on the board of regents at Stephen F. Austin State University for one year, she also became a member of Daughters of the American Revolution and the Daughters of the Republic of Texas. While living out her life outside of congress Thomas received many awards within her community. Some of these awards being, yellow rose of Texas award in 1977, Ralph W. Steen award in 1979, Texas Governor's Tourist Development Award and the Sons of the Republic of Texas Distinguished Service Award in 1985, chosen as Woman of the Day by the Nacogdoches branch of the American Association of University Women in 1990 and in 1991 she was named a Paul Harris Fellow by Rotary International. She resided in Nacogdoches until her death there on July 23, 1993. She was interred in Oak Grove Cemetery.

See also
 Women in the United States House of Representatives

References

1900 births
1993 deaths
People from Houston
People from Nacogdoches, Texas
Brenau University alumni
University of Alabama alumni
Female members of the United States House of Representatives
Women in Texas politics
Democratic Party members of the United States House of Representatives from Texas
20th-century American politicians
20th-century American women politicians